was a onna-musha warrior, one of the relatively few Japanese warrior women commonly known in history or classical literature. She took a prominent role in the Kennin Rebellion, an uprising against the Kamakura shogunate in 1201.

Early life
She lived during the end of the Heian and the beginning of the Kamakura periods. Her other names include .

Career and capture

Hangaku Gozen was a member of the Taira clan who lived with her family in Echigo. Also known as Hangaku Itazaki, she was the daughter of Jo Sukenaga, who was defeated by Kiso Yoshinaka in battle. She joined her uncle, Jo Nagamochi, and cousin, Jo Sukemori, in  the Kennin Rebellion of 1201, and became an integral part of their defensive operations at Torisaka Castle. Hangaku was noted for her leadership and bravery during the three-month long defense during which she and Sukemori led forces of men against Sasaki Moritsuna's bakufu army, who were loyal to the Kamakura Shogunate. "Dressed as a boy", Hangaku stood on the tower of the castle and all those that came to attack her were shot down by her arrows which pierced them either in their chests or their heads. 

The rebel defenses were eventually struck down and Hangaku's fighting stopped only after she was wounded by an arrow that pierced her thigh. She was captured and presented, "fearless as a man and beautiful as a flower", as a prisoner of war to the Shogun Minamoto Yoriiye, who was intrigued by her beauty and reputation. Lady Hangaku was precluded from ritual suicide by the Shogun's orders to marry his retainer, Asari Yoshito. Later, she reportedly delivered a son, but there is little record of the remainder of her life.

The Jō were warriors, allies of the Taira clan, in Echigo Province (present-day Niigata Prefecture). They were defeated in the Genpei Wars, and lost most of their power. In 1201, together with her nephew , she raised an army and joined Sukemoto in his attempt (the Kennin Rebellion) to overthrow the Kamakura Shogunate. Hangaku commanded 3,000 soldiers to defend against an army of 10,000 soldiers loyal to the Hōjō clan.

Ultimately she was wounded by an arrow and captured; the defenses then collapsed. Hangaku was taken to Kamakura. When she was presented to the shōgun Minamoto no Yoriie, she met , a warrior of the Kai-Genji clan, who received the shōgun's permission to marry her. They lived in Kai, where she is said to have had one daughter.

Culture references
Hangaku appears in the Azuma Kagami.

Hangaku is said to have been "fearless as a man and beautiful as a flower," and to have wielded a naginata in battle. Many storytellers and printmakers have portrayed her in their works, including Kuniyoshi, who produced a series of warrior women prints. This series also included such historical or literary figures as Tomoe Gozen, Shizuka Gozen, and Hōjō Masako.

References

Japanese women in warfare
Taira clan
Women in 13th-century warfare
Women of medieval Japan
Japanese warriors
13th-century Japanese women
13th-century Japanese people